Eulechriops is a genus of true weevils in the beetle family Curculionidae. There are more than 80 described species in Eulechriops. The genus name is masculine, contrary to some sources, following ICZN Article 30.1.4.3: "A compound genus-group name ending in -ops is to be treated as masculine, regardless of its derivation or of its treatment by its author."

Species
These 87 species belong to the genus Eulechriops:

 Eulechriops albofasciatus Champion, 1906
 Eulechriops albolineatus Champion, 1906
 Eulechriops angusticollis Champion, 1906
 Eulechriops argyrosoma Poinar & Legalov, 2014
 Eulechriops aschnae Makhan, 2009
 Eulechriops auricollis Hustache, 1932
 Eulechriops bipunctatus Hustache, 1932
 Eulechriops biseriatus Hustache, 1932
 Eulechriops boliviense Hustache, 1939
 Eulechriops boops Champion, 1906
 Eulechriops brevipes Champion, 1906
 Eulechriops carinicollis Hustache, 1931
 Eulechriops centrinoides Hustache, 1939
 Eulechriops chevrolati Hust., 1934
 Eulechriops cinerascens Champion, 1906
 Eulechriops conicicollis Champion, 1906
 Eulechriops coruscus Champion, 1906
 Eulechriops curtus Hustache, 1932
 Eulechriops curvirostris Hustache, 1939
 Eulechriops cylindricollis Champion, 1906
 Eulechriops delicatulus Hustache, 1939
 Eulechriops dorsalis Hustache, 1932
 Eulechriops ductilis Champion, 1906
 Eulechriops elongatus Champion, 1906
 Eulechriops erythroleucus Faust, 1896
 Eulechriops filirostris Champion, 1906
 Eulechriops flavitarsis Champion, 1906
 Eulechriops fulvipennis Hustache, 1932
 Eulechriops gossypii Barber
 Eulechriops gracilis Faust, 1896
 Eulechriops hoplocopturoides Hustache, 1939
 Eulechriops hovorei Hespenheide, 2007
 Eulechriops ingae Hustache, 1941
 Eulechriops ingaphilus Rheinheimer, 2014
 Eulechriops laevirostris Champion, 1906
 Eulechriops latipennis Hustache, 1939
 Eulechriops leucospilus Champion, 1906
 Eulechriops limolatus Hust., 1932
 Eulechriops lizeri Hustache, 1939
 Eulechriops longipennis Champion, 1906
 Eulechriops lugubris Champion, 1906
 Eulechriops maculicollis Champion, 1906
 Eulechriops melancholicus Champion, 1906
 Eulechriops melas Champion, 1906
 Eulechriops minutus (LeConte, 1824)
 Eulechriops minutissimus Hustache, 1932
 Eulechriops muticus Champion, 1906
 Eulechriops nanus Hustache, 1932
 Eulechriops niger Hustache, 1932
 Eulechriops nigrolineatus Champion, 1906
 Eulechriops nitidus Champion, 1906
 Eulechriops obscurus Hustache, 1939
 Eulechriops ochraceus Champion, 1906
 Eulechriops ornatus Champion, 1906
 Eulechriops parallelus Hustache, 1932
 Eulechriops parvulus Hustache, 1932
 Eulechriops perplexus Faust, 1896
 Eulechriops perpusillus Champion, 1906
 Eulechriops pictus Schaeffer
 Eulechriops plagiatus Champion, 1906
 Eulechriops puncticollis Hustache, 1939
 Eulechriops pusillus Champion, 1906
 Eulechriops pygmaeus Champion, 1906
 Eulechriops rubi Hespenheide, 2005
 Eulechriops rubricus Hustache, 1939
 Eulechriops rufipes Hustache, 1932
 Eulechriops rufirostris Hustache, 1932
 Eulechriops rufulus Hustache, 1939
 Eulechriops scutulatus Champion, 1906
 Eulechriops septemnotatus Champion, 1906
 Eulechriops seriatus Champion, 1906
 Eulechriops sexnotatus Champion, 1906
 Eulechriops sibinioides Champion, 1906
 Eulechriops soesilae Makhan, 2009
 Eulechriops squamulatus Champion, 1906
 Eulechriops subbifasciatus Hustache, 1932
 Eulechriops subcylindricus Hustache, 1939
 Eulechriops suturalis Hustache, 1932
 Eulechriops t-album Hustache, 1939
 Eulechriops tenuirostris Champion, 1906
 Eulechriops tricolor Hustache, 1939
 Eulechriops trifasciatus Faust, 1896
 Eulechriops tuberculifer Champion, 1906
 Eulechriops variegatus Hustache, 1932
 Eulechriops vinaceus Hustache, 1939

References

Further reading

 
 
 

Curculionidae
Articles created by Qbugbot